Jun-Muk Hwang (born 27 October 1963) is a South Korean mathematician, specializing in algebraic geometry and complex differential geometry.

Personal life
Hwang is the eldest son of gayageum musician Hwang Byungki and novelist Han Malsook.

Education and career
Hwang studied physics at Seoul National University for his bachelors before studying physics at Harvard University. In 1993, he completed his PhD under the direction of Yum-Tong Siu with thesis  Global nondeformability of the complex hyper quadric. In the following years he held positions at the University of Notre Dame, the Mathematical Sciences Research Institute, and Seoul National University. Since 1999, he was a professor at the Korea Institute for Advanced Study. He was in 2006 an invited speaker with talk Rigidity of rational homogeneous spaces at the International Congress of Mathematicians (ICM) in Madrid and in 2014 a plenary speaker with talk Mori geometry meets Cartan geometry: Varieties of minimal rational tangents at the ICM in Seoul.

In 2020, he was the founding director of the Center for Complex Geometry at the Institute for Basic Science.

Awards and honors
2021: National Academy of Sciences Award, National Academy of Sciences, South Korea
2012: Fellow, American Mathematical Society
2009: Ho-Am Prize in Science, Am Prize, The Ho Am Foundation
2007: Fellow, Korean Academy of Science and Technology
2006: Best Scientist-Engineer of Korea, Ministry of Science and Technology
2006: Scientist of the Year Award, Korean National Assembly
2001: Korea Science Award, Ministry of Science and Technology
2000: Award for Excellent Article, Korean Mathematical Society

Selected publications

References

External links
 
 
  (Mori geometry meets Cartan geometry: Varieties of minimal rational tangents)
 황준묵 대학교수 - Naver 인물검색

1963 births
Living people
Seoul National University alumni
Harvard University alumni
University of Notre Dame faculty
Academic staff of Seoul National University
21st-century South Korean mathematicians
Fellows of the American Mathematical Society
Recipients of the Ho-Am Prize in Science
20th-century South Korean mathematicians